Robert Francis Keefe (June 16, 1882 – December 6, 1964) was an American pitcher in professional baseball. He played in Major League Baseball (MLB) for the New York Highlanders and Cincinnati Reds.

Baseball career
Keefe was born in Folsom, California, in 1882. In 1902, he graduated from Santa Clara College, where he was a star pitcher.

Keefe started his professional baseball career with the Sacramento Senators in 1903, the first year of the Pacific Coast League (PCL). The following year, the Sacramento franchise moved to Tacoma, Washington, and Keefe spent two seasons with the Tacoma Tigers. In 1904, he had 438.2 innings pitched, a win–loss record of 34–15, and a 2.40 earned run average (ERA). He had the second-most wins in the PCL and helped the Tigers win the league championship. In 1905, Keefe had 468.2 innings pitched and went 30–22 with a 1.61 ERA. He had the second-most wins in the PCL again.

Keefe then played for the Montreal Royals of the Eastern League from 1906 to 1910. In 1907, he also played for the American League's New York Highlanders. Keefe had 57.2 innings pitched, a 3–5 record, and a 2.50 ERA during his first major league season.

In 1911, Keefe made it back to the majors with the National League's Cincinnati Reds. He had his best season in MLB in 1911, going 12–13 with a 2.69 ERA in 234.1 innings pitched. The following year, he went 1–3 with a 5.24 ERA in 68.2 innings pitched and never played in the majors again.

Keefe played in the minor leagues from 1913 to 1915 and again in 1921 before leaving professional baseball.

Later life
While playing for the Cincinnati Reds, Keefe met Margaret Carroll, who later became his wife. The couple raised four children: Helen Roberta Keefe, Carol B. Keefe, Robert Gael Keefe, and John Franklin Keefe.

After his baseball career ended, Keefe returned to the Folsom area, where he worked for the Natomas Gold Dredging Company. He later became the county assessor for East Sacramento County. For several years, he was in charge of the water system for the Folsom area. In his last years before retirement, Keefe was also the postmaster of Folsom. He retired to the Land Park area of Sacramento.

Keefe died in 1964.

References

External links

1882 births
1964 deaths
Major League Baseball pitchers
Cincinnati Reds players
New York Highlanders players
Sacramento Senators players
Tacoma Tigers players
Montreal Royals players
Rochester Hustlers players
Portland Beavers players
San Francisco Seals (baseball) players
Baseball players from California
People from Folsom, California